Krešimir Čač (born 12 January 1976 in Zagreb) is a butterfly and medley swimmer from Croatia, who competed in three consecutive Summer Olympics for his native country, starting in 1996. He retired from swimming in 2008.

Čač is a former national record holder for the 200 and 400 m medley.

References

External links
 
 
 
 

1976 births
Living people
Male butterfly swimmers
Male medley swimmers
Olympic swimmers of Croatia
Swimmers at the 1996 Summer Olympics
Swimmers at the 2000 Summer Olympics
Swimmers at the 2004 Summer Olympics
Swimmers from Zagreb
Mediterranean Games silver medalists for Croatia
Mediterranean Games bronze medalists for Croatia
Swimmers at the 1997 Mediterranean Games
Mediterranean Games medalists in swimming